Sri Rajarajeswari Matriculation Higher Secondary School (SRRMHSS), previously Shri Rajarajeswari Matriculation School (SRRMS), is a private educational institution located at Kangayam, in Tirupur District of Tamil Nadu. The school offers classes from Lower Kindergarten (LKG) to Twelfth grade.

History 
The school was started as a primary school in the year 1994. The school slowly expanded, and in the year 2000, it had classes till Twelfth grade.

Campuses 
The school  accommodates till Twelfth grade, and is located just outside Kangayam town, at Veeranampalayam.

Extra-curricular activities and other facilities 
Summer Camps for sports are organised annually. Cultural programmes are conducted at regular intervals. Yoga is taught regularly to students of all classes. A cafeteria and a library are available within the campus. Separate hostels for boys and girls are available. Parent-Teacher meetings are organised regularly. Transport Facilities are arranged by the school administration for students on request, through institution-owned buses. The school has produced state-level ranks in the past.

References

Primary schools in Tamil Nadu
High schools and secondary schools in Tamil Nadu
Tiruppur district
Educational institutions established in 1994
1994 establishments in Tamil Nadu